Jamaica is an unincorporated community in Middlesex County, Virginia, United States. Jamaica had a post office, which closed on August 5, 2006. The Virginia Motor Speedway is located in Jamaica.

References

Unincorporated communities in Middlesex County, Virginia
Unincorporated communities in Virginia